Clay Priest (born 5 February 1989) is an Australian rugby league footballer who last played for the Canterbury-Bankstown Bulldogs in the National Rugby League. He has previously played for the Canberra Raiders.

Background
Born in Penrith, New South Wales, Priest played his junior rugby league for Brothers Penrith, before being signed by the Mount Pritchard Mounties.

Playing career

Early career
In 2014, Priest joined the Mount Pritchard Mounties in the New South Wales Cup, while training with NRL side Canberra Raiders during the pre-season.

2016
After impressing for the Mounties, Priest was handed a second-tier contract with the Raiders and made his NRL debut for them against the Wests Tigers in round 8 of the 2016 NRL season. On 18 August, he re-signed with the Raiders on a 2-year contract until the end of 2018. He finished his debut season with 14 NRL matches.

2017
Priest played 17 NRL matches for the Raiders during the 2017 season. In November, he signed a contract with the Canterbury-Bankstown Bulldogs for the 2018 season, in a swap deal with Bulldogs player Brad Abbey joining the Raiders.

2018
On 27 August, Priest was one of the players announced by Canterbury to be leaving at the end of the season after his contract was not renewed by the club.

References

External links
Canterbury Bulldogs profile
Canberra Raiders profile

1989 births
Australian rugby league players
Indigenous Australian rugby league players
Canberra Raiders players
Canterbury-Bankstown Bulldogs players
Mount Pritchard Mounties players
Rugby league locks
Rugby league props
Living people
Rugby league players from Sydney